Olinalá  is a city and seat of the municipality of Olinalá, in the state of Guerrero, south-western Mexico. It is well known throughout the country for its crafts, called Lacas de Olinalá (Olinalá lacquers).

Art

Olinalá is located in the state of Guerrero. It is considered the most important center for the production of lacquer in Mexico.

In Olinalá there are artisan workshops that have passed the techniques for lacquer production from generation to generation since the technique arrived from Asia via the Spanish "Manila Galleon" trading ships also known as the Nao de la China. The wide variety of products made using these techniques range from everyday use objects, such as trays, chests, folding screens, to famous decorative lacquered boxes known as "cajitas de Olinalá". These crafts are part of a long and laborious process that involves approximately 29 steps.

There are different techniques involved in the decoration of these works: golden on the lacquered wood is made with a very fine paintbrush made of cat hair. The "rayado vaciado" with two layers of lacquer; the "rayado punteado" and traditional decorations with bright colors. Each work is let dry for various days before applying the last step: a varnish with linseed oil.

The motifs in the decorations also vary. Generally, they are nature themes, and can range from flowers, foliages and landscapes to animals, with a strong preference for the rabbit. The result is a perfectly finished work, of lively colors and entirely unique.

References

Populated places in Guerrero